Heather Elizabeth Langenkamp (born July 17, 1964) is an American actress. She is considered an influential figure in horror films and in popular culture, noted for her acting in several works of the genre and her behind-the-scenes work coordinating prosthetic makeup. She is established as a scream queen, and was inducted into the Fangoria Chainsaw Hall of Fame in 1995. 

Born in Tulsa, Oklahoma to an artist and a petroleum attorney, Langenkamp spent her childhood on a farm. While working for the Tulsa Tribune at the age of 19, she got cast as an extra in Francis Ford Coppola's The Outsiders (1983) and Rumble Fish (1983), and whilst attending Stanford University, she played her first leading role in the little-seen Nickel Mountain (1984). Langenkamp earned widespread recognition for headlining Wes Craven's slasher film A Nightmare on Elm Street (1984) as the resourceful 15-year-old heroine Nancy Thompson. The film emerged as a critical and commercial success and spawned the similarly-titled franchise, in which Langenkamp reprises the role of Nancy for its third installment, Dream Warriors (1987). Her final appearance in the Nightmare on Elm Street franchise was the self-aware horror film Wes Craven's New Nightmare (1994), where she received acclaim for playing both a fictionalized version of herself and Nancy.  

Langenkamp has starred in numerous television series and made-for-television films throughout her career such as the drama film Passions (1984), the Emmy Award–winning ABC sitcoms Growing Pains (1988–1990) and Just the Ten of Us (1988–1990), the satirical film Tonya and Nancy: The Inside Story (1994), the anthology series Perversions of Science (1997), the Syfy–film Truth or Dare (2017), the adult animated series JJ Villard's Fairy Tales (2020), and the Mike Flanagan created Netflix series The Midnight Club (2022). Her further film roles include The Butterfly Room (2012), Star Trek Into Darkness (2013), Cottonmouth (2020) and My Little Pony: A New Generation (2021). She has expanded her career, and has worked as the special makeup effects coordinator for movies such as Dawn of the Dead (2004), Cinderella Man (2005), Evan Almighty (2007), and The Cabin in the Woods (2012). 

Langenkamp met her husband, Oscar-winning make-up artist David LeRoy Anderson, at a wrap party for Wes Craven's The Serpent and the Rainbow (1988) and together they run the make-up FX firm AFX Studio.

Early life
Heather Elizabeth Langenkamp was born in Tulsa, Oklahoma. Her mother, Mary Alice (née Myers), is an artist. Her father, Robert Dobie Langenkamp, is a petroleum attorney. Her father was a Deputy Assistant Secretary of Energy in the Carter Administration, where he was partially responsible for realizing the Strategic Petroleum Reserve. He worked under the Clinton Administration, where he helped with privatizing Naval Petroleum Reserve No. 1. He later was the Director of the National Energy & Environmental Law & Policy Institute of the University of Tulsa College of Law. She later moved to Washington, D.C. after her father's appointment to the Carter administration, where she attended the National Cathedral School for Girls, with classmate and future Stanford University roommate Susan Rice.

Career

Early work 
At the age of eighteen, Langenkamp worked for the Tulsa Tribune. She saw an advertisement looking for extras for Francis Ford Coppola's The Outsiders in the summer of 1983. Auditions took place at a nearby elementary school where Langenkamp gave the casting director her Polaroid.  She got a call back to appear in a high school scene. Amidst what seemed like "hundreds" of other adolescents, she had to wear 1950s based attire. The same summer, Coppola was shooting another film, Rumble Fish. Her friend got a phone call to appear in a street scene. Her friend's mother felt more comfortable with Langenkamp going with her to the set at night. The assistant director informed her that they had dialogue and wanted to give it to her. She did several takes of her saying dialogue to Matt Dillon's character. The scenes didn't make it into the final product of either film. Despite this, these extra parts helped her get into the Screen Actors Guild. Langenkamp stayed in close contact with the casting director, her assistant, and the producer. 

While studying at Stanford University, she would travel to Los Angeles to pursue acting opportunities. Her first official Hollywood audition was for Drew Denbaum's Nickel Mountain (1984), an adaptation of John Gardner's 1973 novel. During the audition, her rented car got hit by a runaway truck on Cahuenga Boulevard.  Denbaum and the casting director helped Langenkamp during the ordeal. She bonded with them and got cast in the lead role of Callie Wells. She has expressed regret for doing the nude scene as she feared voicing her discomfort at the time of filming. She was later cast as Beth alongside Joanne Woodward and Richard Crenna in the CBS television film Passions (1984). The direction towards her character received praise.

Rise to prominence 
Langenkamp became aware of auditions for a horror film known as A Nightmare on Elm Street (1984) in the winter of 1983. Casting director Annette Benson was familiar to Langenkamp as she had brought her in to read for the lead role in Night of the Comet (1984) although the part ultimately went to Catherine Mary Stewart. She auditioned for the highly sought after role of fifteen-year-old heroine Nancy. There were not enough chairs to accommodate the number of actresses auditioning. Her reading impressed both Benson and director Wes Craven enough that she was called back to read with another actress auditioning, Amanda Wyss. Craven stated that he wanted someone very "non-Hollywood" and someone who embodied the "all-American, girl-next-door" for the role and believed that Langenkamp had these qualities. Craven informed her that she got the part that winter, although shooting didn't begin until June 1984. She beat out more than 200 actresses auditioning for the part. She won the Best Actress Award at the Avoriaz Film Festival for her role as Nancy, and Empire magazine wrote that "Heather Langenkamp [is] an appealing high school lead."

In 1984, she starred in the music video for ZZ Top's "Sleeping Bag". In 1986, she guest-starred in CBS Schoolbreak Special and ABC Afterschool Specials. Langenkamp was cast in Suburban Beat (1985), a television pilot that was not picked up for a full series, where she played Hope Sherman, the youngest housewife. Craven approached Langenkamp to reprise her role of Nancy in the sequel A Nightmare on Elm Street 3: Dream Warriors (1987), about the survivors of Freddy Krueger's previous attempts; it opened to box office success in 1987 grossing over $44 million, and earned positive reviews. Later, she had a guest appearance as Tracy in the television series The New Adventures of Beans Baxter and Monica on the soap opera Hotel (both in 1987). Langenkamp obtained further recognition when she portrayed lead character Marie Lubbock on the ABC television series Just the Ten of Us, a spin-off of the popular ABC situation comedy Growing Pains (on which she guest-starred), from 1988 to 1990. Both shows won Emmy Awards. That year, she and her castmates were nominated for the Young Artist Award for Best Young Actor/Actress Ensemble in a Television Comedy, Drama Series or Special. 

Langenkamp had a cameo role as the first victim of Horace Pinker in Wes Craven's horror film Shocker (1989). In the film, she is on a news report being pulled away on a stretcher. Following this, she portrayed the figure skater Nancy Kerrigan in the NBC television film Tonya & Nancy: The Inside Story (also released in 1994), which focused on Tonya Harding's husband's attack. 

Langenkamp returned to the Elm Street franchise with Wes Craven's New Nightmare, which is a standalone film, and follows the journey Freddy Krueger takes to the real world. She instead starred as a fictionalized version of herself, which was based on a stalking incident she was subject to that involved a fan angry over the cancellation of her show, Just the Ten of Us. On the film, Langenkamp stated "It's a really interesting concept, and it's one of the only horror movies where the monster's really in the background, at least until the end. But it's all about our mentality about fear." Wes Craven's New Nightmare was released in 1994, and opened to critical praise, being cited as an influential "metahorror" film. Langenkamp's acting earned acclaim, with several critics dubbing it her magnum opus. Review website Slasher Studios wrote that "The performances are pitch perfect, led by a tour-de-force performance by the amazing Langenkamp." In a video ranking the Nightmare on Elm Street films, James A. Janisse, the host of the YouTube channel Dead Meat, stated that Langenkamp "is in top form and gives her best performance of the franchise here, likely a product of her age and greater life experience." For her performance, she won the Fangoria Chainsaw Award for Best Actress.

Continued success and expansion 
Langenkamp starred in Robert Kurtzman's low-budget superhero film The Demolitionist (1995). In 1997, she portrayed Lou Ann Solomon in one episode of the short-lived science fiction/horror television series Perversions of Science. She later starred in the direct-to-video film Fugitive Mind (1999). In 2000, she had a guest role in 18 Wheels of Justice as a waitress. The following year, she and her husband, David LeRoy Anderson, launched the Malibu Gum Factory which sold locally manufactured chewing gum that featured trading cards of local surfers inside each package. Langenkamp played Janet Thompson in an episode of JAG (2002). After this, she took a break from acting to focus on her family. In 2005, she was cast in the Wes Craven horror film Cursed. The film had to be reshot and rewritten, causing her to leave due to scheduling conflicts. 

Langenkamp portrayed a fictionalized version of herself in the indie mockumentary film The Bet (2007). It was released as a web series with the same title in April 2020. She starred in, executive produced, and narrated the 2010 documentary Never Sleep Again: The Elm Street Legacy. The following year, she produced a documentary entitled I Am Nancy, which focused on her experience portraying Nancy in the A Nightmare on Elm Street films. Langenkamp portrayed Dorothy in the horror film The Butterfly Room (2012). As a partner in her husband's Special FX Make-up company, AFX Studio, she worked on the horror-comedy film The Cabin in the Woods. In 2013, Langenkamp appeared as herself in the documentary Fantasm and had a small role of an alien in the film, Star Trek Into Darkness in which her husband David LeRoy Anderson designed all of the Special FX make-up. In 2014, she made a cameo appearance in the fourth season of the horror anthology series American Horror Story, titled Freak Show, as a Tupperware party lady.<ref>{{cite web|last1=Squires|first1=John|title=Heather Langenkamp in American Horror Story: Freakshow.|url=http://ihorror.com/spot-nightmare-elm-street-star-american-horror-story-last-night/|access-date=October 4, 2015|website=iHorror|date=December 11, 2014 }}</ref>

In 2015, Langenkamp was cast in the short film Intruder, portrayed Sharon Monroe in four episodes of the drama series The Bay, and narrated the short horror film Vault of the Macabre II. In 2016, she starred in the horror drama film Home. Langenkamp had a cameo role in the short horror comedy film The Sub (2017) and appeared as herself in the documentary Unearthed & Untold: The Path to Pet Sematary (2017). She has a cameo appearance in the horror sequel film Hellraiser: Judgment. Also that year, she portrayed the adult version of the "final girl" Donna Boone in the Syfy television horror film Truth or Dare, guiding a group of teenagers with their battle with a deadly spirit that left her physically scarred several years prior. She is confirmed to have the anchoring role in the Mike Flanagan written, directed, and executive produced Netflix series The Midnight Club (2022). Langenkamp voices Dazzle Feather and Mayflower in My Little Pony: A New Generation (2021).

Personal life
Jill Simpson, the assistant to The Outsiders (1984) casting director, became a close friend of Langenkamp. Simpson worked as the assistant on Wes Craven's The Serpent and the Rainbow (1988) and suggested that Langenkamp attend a wrap party to meet one of the crew members. There, she met make-up artist David LeRoy Anderson and the two began a relationship shortly after. Anderson proposed to her on the set of Mary Lambert's Pet Sematary'' (1989) and they wed that year. They had two children together, son Daniel "Atticus" Anderson, who died in 2018 as the result of a brain tumor, and daughter Isabelle Anderson. She was previously married to Alan Pasqua, a musician, from 1984 until 1987.

Filmography

Film

Television

Web series

Music videos

Awards and nominations

Notes

References

Further reading

External links

 
 
 
 

1964 births
20th-century American actresses
21st-century American actresses
Actresses from Tulsa, Oklahoma
American film actresses
American people of English descent
American people of German descent
American people of Scottish descent
American television actresses
Living people
National Cathedral School alumni
Stanford University alumni